Scomi Group Berhad is a global service provider that is based in Selangor, Sabah, Malaysia and is mainly involved in oil & gas, transport engineering and marine transportation.

Scomi Group Bhd is listed on the main board of Bursa Malaysia Securities Berhad, and its group of companies are involved in oilfield services, public transportation and marine services. The group offers drilling fluids (DF) and related engineering services, drilling waste management (DWM) solutions, distribution of oilfield products and services, marine vessel services, machine shop services, transport engineering products involving special purpose vehicles, rail wagons, monorail vehicles and buses, supply of industrial and production chemicals and carbon dioxide separation. The group was founded in 1961 and operates across 48 locations in 22 countries.

Activities 
The company provides oilfield drilling fluids and drilling waste management services and also supplies monorail projects through its Scomi Rail subsidiary. Other companies under Scomi Group listed on Bursa Malaysia Securities Berhad are Scomi Marine Berhad and Scomi Engineering Berhad.

Other companies in the Scomi group include Scomi Oilfield Limited (Bermuda), Scomi Oiltools Limited (Bermuda), Scomi Capital Limited (Labuan), Scomi International Private Limited (Singapore), Scomi Ecosolve Limited (British Virgin Islands).

The company's subsidiaries and associate companies are involved in:

 oilfield services, which comprises integrated drilling fluids and drilling waste management solutions; OCTG machine shops and distribution of oilfield products and services
 transport, which comprises rail, monorail and buses for the transportation sector and special purpose vehicles for the aviation, health, defense, commercial and rescue services
energy logistics, which provides marine vessels for the coal and oil and gas industry
production enhancement, which comprises industrial and production chemicals division; and gas business, which mainly provides gas processing equipment.

History
The Scomi Group has its roots in Subang Commercial Motor Industries (S.C.O.M.I.) incorporated in 1990.

In 2000, Scomi was acquired by Kaspadu Sdn Bhd a company controlled by Shah Hakim Zain and Kamaluddin Abdullah.

When the founders of the company took over Subang Commercial Motor Industries, the main motivation for the acquisition was the coach building business.
Eventually, the drilling fluids business became the main business for the group, which led to its listing on the then second board of Bursa Malaysia. In 2004, it bought a 71% stake in Oiltools International Ltd to expand its oil and gas business.

Not long after that it took over jewellery company Habib Corp Bhd, which would later become Scomi Marine, and it entered into a RM1.3bil deal to buy vessels from Chuan Hup and stakes in CH Offshore Ltd and PT Rig Tenders Indonesia.
The company moved its engineering division into the listed shell corporation of Bell & Order Bhd, which later became Scomi Engineering in 2006.

In 2007, Scomi Engineering bought Mtrans, a bus and monorail operator, for RM25mil.

Scomi's major shareholder is Datuk Kamaluddin Abdullah, son of former prime minister Abdullah Ahmad Badawi.

Monorail
Scomi Rail was a subdivision that developed monorail systems, as the company sought to diversify its business lines.

In 2019, Scomi Rail was placed in receivership and it is no longer selling its monorail system.

Operating monorail systems using Scomi:
 KL Monorail Developed by Scomi Transport Systems
 Mumbai Monorail (Opened in February 2014, work began in January 2009)

Other monorail projects involving Scomi:
 Jakarta Monorail (project cancelled after work had commenced)
 Manaus Monorail, in Brazil (contract signed in 2012 with Scomi but construction was not started)
 Putrajaya Monorail (work suspended in 2014, as of 2020 the local government is seeking interest to revive the project)
 São Paulo Metro Line 17 Gold, in Brazil, connecting inner city Congonhas airport to several conventional rail metro lines and the district of Morumbi.  Scomi contract cancelled in 2019 for non-performance, awarding to BYD instead.

Research

Typically, monorails carry fewer passengers than a LRT or MRT. Following research and development, Scomi announced a monorail with an eight-car configuration, versus the current four-car configuration for the monorail in Mumbai. This monorail can carry 1,000 passengers, the same as a six-car LRT.

Scomi Engineering ploughs back some 20% of its revenue into research and development on trains. The next-generation monorails it is building is called Gen 3.0 and would be the size of a LRT wagon.

It is also evaluating the prospect of going into trains, where it can build LRTs or EMU (electrical multiple units), which is the kind of trains KTM uses for commuter service.

Awards
The company was awarded the GreenTech Environment Excellence Silver Award 2009, by New Delhi's GreenTech Foundation. Scomi was declared the winner of the award under the engineering sector for raw materials consumption and products manufactured for buses and coaches which contributed to the protection of the environment and surrounding community.

Scomi won the Industry Excellence Award 2008 given by the Malaysian Ministry of International Trade and Industry for its performance in exports.

Controversies

In the past, Scomi has faced US sanctions imposed on CEO Shah Hakim Zain. These sanctions arose following allegations of Scomi being part of an international nuclear proliferation programme masterminded by Pakistan's Abdul Qadeer Khan.

The Malaysian police announced that one of Scomi's main backers, Buhary Syed Abu Tahir, confessed to helping Dr Khan sell nuclear secrets and supplies to Iran and Libya. Tahir, a Sri Lankan national, is reported to have links with international crime boss Dawood Ibrahim. Tahir was detained without trial from 2006 to 2008 for allegedly being a national security risk, having been accused of fraudulently convincing a Scomi subsidiary company to produce components for centrifuges to be used in a uranium enrichment program.

Scomi has insisted that B.S.A. Tahir had misled it to believe that the parts were for the oil and gas industry. However, B.S.A. Tahir is reported to have said that Scomi's CEO, Shah Hakim Zain, and Scomi's main backer, Kamaluddin Abdullah (son of then Prime Minister Abdullah Ahmad Badawi), both knew the final destination of the products. He has accused Scomi of making fraudulent declarations and in 2009 he sued Shah Hakim and Kamaluddin for MYR75 million.

The Inspector General of Police in Malaysia investigated these allegations in depth, and concluded that in his report that:
"The management of SCOPE were unaware that the exported components were part of certain centrifuge unit for LIBYA. The management of SCOPE considered it a legitimate business deal. To untrained eyes, such components would not raise any concern, as the components are similar to components that could be used by the 'petrol -chemical industry' and 'water treatment' and various other industries."

Investigators also found that "SCOPE obtained the semi-finished product to produce the said components from a German company Bikar Metal and this gives the impression that these items are not controlled items. In view of the foregoing, the work that was carried out on the semi-finished product is legitimate and does not give rise to suspicion." (Quotes are from Police report).

See also
 List of oilfield service companies

References

1961 establishments in Malaya
Oil and gas companies of Malaysia
Manufacturing companies of Malaysia
Companies listed on Bursa Malaysia